HMS Favorite was one of the three wooden warships of moderate dimension (the others being  and ) selected by Sir Edward Reed for conversion to broadside ironclads in response to the increased tempo of French warship building.

Background and design
Favorite was named after a French prize-of-war, and hence her name is spelled in the French way. She was laid down as a corvette of 22 guns of the Jason class, and was selected for conversion after being two years on the builder's slipway. The hull form was already complete, so modifications were restricted to the installation of a rounded stern and a straight stem in place of the traditional overhanging stern and knee bow.

She carried her armour in a box battery amidships, and the guns carried therein, four on each side, were the heaviest naval cannon of the day. A degree of axial (fore and aft) fire was enabled through an arrangement in which part of the battery wall could be recessed, and one of the guns could be traversed around, about its own axis, to fire through the space thus produced.

She was regarded as a good sea-boat, but rolled more than most; her armament could therefore only have been fought in smooth water, and the movement of the forward or after guns to fire through the axial recesses would have been hazardous in the extreme in anything other than smooth water.

Service history 
She was commissioned at Sheerness for the North America and West Indies station, returning home in August 1869 for refit. On 3 August 1875, she ran aground on the Scroby Sands, Norfolk. She was refloated and found to be undamaged. She paid off at Portsmouth in 1876 and was laid up until sold.

References 

Sources

 

Ships built on the River Medway
1864 ships
Corvettes of the Royal Navy
Maritime incidents in August 1875